The Lithuanian-Muscovite War of 1487–1494 (First border war) was the war of the Grand Duchy of Moscow, in alliance with the Crimean Khanate, against the Grand Duchy of Lithuania and Ruthenia in alliance with the Golden Horde Khan Akhmat, united by personal union (Union of Krewo). Kingdom of Poland under the leadership of Grand Duke Casimir IV Jagiellon. 

Grand Duchy of Lithuania and Ruthenia  was home for Ruthenians (ethnic Ukrainians, Belarusians) and the war was going for capturing Belarusians and Ukrainian lands (Kievan inheritance) under Moscow rule.

History 
By the 1480s, the Grand Duchy of Moscow had conquered the Novgorod Republic, the Principality of Tver, and in 1487, Moscow's troops took Kazan and made the Khanate of Kazan own vassal. At the same time, the doctrine of the "Third Rome" was formed in Moscow, and the Muscovite princes began to actively "collect Russian lands" that had previously been part of Kievan Rus'. 

In the second half of the 15th century, the Moscow launched an active offensive on Ukrainian and Belarusian lands. At the same time, after the civil war in the Grand Duchy of Lithuania (1432–1438) and the unsuccessful attempt to create the Grand Duchy of Rus, some of the Ukrainian magnates and princes decided to turn to Moscow for help. Disagreeing with the policy of unification of the Lithuanian-Rus state with Poland, they negotiated with the Moscow prince and even began to move to the Moscow. 

In the summer of 1482, Prince Ivan III of Russia sent an embassy, valuable gifts, and a considerable sum of money to the Crimean Khan Meñli I Giray with an attempt to attack the Ukrainian lands. Mengli Geray, at the urging of the Grand Prince of Moscow, went on a campaign to Kyiv. On September 1, he captured the city, burned cathedrals and churches, and captured many people. As a gift to Prince Ivan of Moscow, the khan sent a cart with looted goods from Kyiv's cathedrals and churches, including an iconostasis, a golden bowl and a discus from St. Sophia Cathedral. 

At the same time, in the 1480s, a number of raids by Moscow detachments took place on the border territories of the Grand Duchy of Lithuania, Russia and Samogitia. Thus, in 1487, Prince Ivan Vorotynsky attacked Mezetsk and plundered it. This was the reason for the official start of the war. 

The Moscow-Lithuanian war is divided into two stages: 
 1st stage 1487—1492; 
 2nd stage 1492—1494 

The first stage took place, mostly in border skirmishes in the north-eastern principalities of the Grand Duchy of Lithuania and Ruthenia. 

In 1492–1494, concluding a new alliance with the Crimean Khan, Moscow made a number of joint campaigns in the Kyiv, Podillya, Volyn, and Chernihiv regions. Thus, in 1493 Mengli-Girey together with the Grand Duke of Moscow Ivan III conducted a joint campaign in Kyiv and Kyiv region.

Result 
In February 1494, the Eternal Peace was concluded, according to which most of the so-called "Upper Oka Principalities" went to Moscow, and Lithuania agreed to give Veliky Novgorod, Pskov, Tver and Ryazan to Moscow. Moscow renounced its claims to Smolensk and Bryansk, which remained part of the Grand Duchy of Lithuania and Ruthenia. In addition, the Grand Duke of Lithuania (since 1492) Alexander Jagiellon married Ivan III's daughter Elena.

References 

Conflicts in 1488
Conflicts in 1489
Conflicts in 1490
Conflicts in 1491
Conflicts in 1492
Conflicts in 1493
Conflicts in 1494
1487 in Europe
1488 in Europe
1489 in Europe
1490 in Europe
1491 in Europe
1492 in Europe
1493 in Europe
1494 in Europe
Wars involving the Grand Duchy of Lithuania
Wars involving Russia
Lithuanian–Russian wars
15th century in Lithuania
15th century in the Grand Duchy of Moscow
15th-century military history of Russia